The Diary Tour is the second concert tour by American singer-songwriter, Alicia Keys. The tour supports her second studio album The Diary of Alicia Keys (2003). The show predominantly visited North America.

Opening act
John Legend

Setlist
"Instrumental Sequence" 
"Karma"
"Jane Doe"
"Rock wit U"
"Heartburn"
"If I Was Your Woman" / "Walk on By"
"A Woman's Worth"
"Black Ivory Soul" 
"God Bless the Child"
"How Come You Don't Call Me"
"Wake Up"
"Diary"
"Instrumental Sequence" 
"Girlfriend"
"My Boo"
"So Simple"
"Why Do I Feel So Sad"
"Instrumental Sequence"
"Good Morning Heartache"
"I Put a Spell on You"
"Fallin'"
"You Don't Know My Name"
"If I Ain't Got You"

Tour dates

Festivals and other miscellaneous performances
Houston Livestock Show and Rodeo

Cancellations and rescheduled shows

Box office score data

References

2005 concert tours
Alicia Keys concert tours